Clinton Community High School is a secondary school located in Clinton, Illinois, USA. Students who attend the school live in Clinton and surrounding towns such as Wapella, Kenney, Hallsville and Lane.

The superintendent is Curt Nettles and the principal is Jerry Wayne.

In 2012–2013, 566 students attended Clinton High School. The average class size was about 18.5 students, which is below the state average.

In 2012-13 the graduation rate was 90.5% compared with the state average of 87%. The attendance rate was 93.2%, below the state rate of 94.2.

Clinton had an average composite score of 197 on the ACT exam.

Athletics 
The Clinton Maroons participate in the Central Illinois Conference in the following sports:
Baseball (boys)
Basketball (both)
Cheerleading (girls)
Cross country (coed)
American football (boys)
Golf (both)
M-Squad (girls)
Softball (girls)
Swimming (both)
Track and field (both)
Volleyball (girls)
Wrestling (boys)

Notable alumni
 Keith Brendley, expert on active protection systems and founder of Artis, a company that provides products and services for defense and safety markets

References

2013 School Report cards, Clinton High School
Clinton High School- Clinton, Illinois. Retrieved March 27, 2012, from 

Public high schools in Illinois
Schools in DeWitt County, Illinois